Dave Thomas (born 5 October 1950) is an English former professional footballer who played as a winger, totalling over 450 league appearances for Burnley, Queens Park Rangers, Everton, Vancouver Whitecaps, Middlesbrough, Portsmouth and Wolverhampton Wanderers over almost 20 years. He made eight appearances for the England national team.

Club career
Thomas made his senior debut in Burnley's 8–1 defeat to West Bromwich Albion in the 1966–67 season.

Thomas's most successful season was undoubtedly 1975–76 while playing for Queens Park Rangers. QPR led the First Division for much of the season, narrowly missing out by one point to Liverpool after the final game of the season. Thomas was a pivotal figure in the team, providing Stan Bowles, Gerry Francis and others with outstanding service from the wing.

Following his transfer to Everton, Thomas continued to enjoy success in the 1977–78 season while playing for Everton. Everton's top marksman Bob Latchford scored 30 goals in the league that season, Thomas providing more of his goals than anybody else with some more accurate crosses. His transfer in October 1972 from Burnley to QPR was then a record fee for a Second Division Club: £165,000. In 1981, Thomas played a single summer season with the Vancouver Whitecaps in the North American Soccer League.

International career
He won eight England caps overall whilst at Queens Park Rangers. His first England cap was given to him by manager Don Revie on 30 October 1974 in a 3–0 win against Czechoslovakia. He set up the first goal in the game. In England's April 1975 European Championship qualifier against Cyprus, Thomas came on as a substitute and made both of England's remaining two goals in their 5–0 victory; his cross for the first of those two goals was his first touch of the game.

Style of play
A skilful and fast player, for much of his career his trademark was playing without shin pads; something that would be contrary to the rules of the game today.

References

Sources
England profile

External links
The Hall of Fame Number 44 – Dave Thomas
Sporting Heroes site
Blast from the Past Official QPR site interview Jan 2008
The Unofficial QPR Hall of Fame

English footballers
1950 births
Queens Park Rangers F.C. players
Everton F.C. players
Burnley F.C. players
Wolverhampton Wanderers F.C. players
North American Soccer League (1968–1984) players
Vancouver Whitecaps (1974–1984) players
Middlesbrough F.C. players
Portsmouth F.C. players
England international footballers
England under-23 international footballers
People from Kirkby-in-Ashfield
Footballers from Nottinghamshire
Living people
Association football midfielders
English expatriate sportspeople in Canada
Expatriate soccer players in Canada
English expatriate footballers